Rincon is an unincorporated community in San Diego County, California, United States. Its elevation is 1030 feet above sea level. Its coordinates are 33 degrees north, 117 degrees west. Its ZIP code is 92061. The community is located near the Rincon Indian Reservation, from which the name is derived.

Climate
According to the Köppen Climate Classification system, Rincon has a warm-summer Mediterranean climate, abbreviated "Csa" on climate maps.

References

Unincorporated communities in San Diego County, California
Unincorporated communities in California